Anthony J. Carson (April 23, 1869 – April 25, 1943) was a United States Army Corporal who received the Medal of Honor for actions during the Philippine–American War. Carson was awarded the Medal on January 4, 1906, for actions on April 15–19, 1900. His medal was awarded by President Theodore Roosevelt. Carson would later admit that the battle was a defeat.

Medal of Honor citation
Rank and Organization: Corporal, Company H, 43d Infantry, U.S. Volunteers. Place and Date: At Catubig, Samar, Philippine Islands, April 15–19, 1900. Entered Service At: Malden, Mass. Birth: Boston, Mass. Date of Issue: January 4, 1906.

Citation:
Assumed command of a detachment of the company which had survived an overwhelming attack of the enemy, and by his bravery and untiring efforts and the exercise of extraordinary good judgment in the handling of his men successfully withstood for 2 days the attacks of a large force of the enemy, thereby saving the lives of the survivors and protecting the wounded until relief came.

See also

List of Medal of Honor recipients
List of Philippine–American War Medal of Honor recipients

Notes

References

1869 births
1943 deaths
American military personnel of the Philippine–American War
United States Army soldiers
United States Army Medal of Honor recipients
People from Boston
Philippine–American War recipients of the Medal of Honor